The Chang Gung Medical Foundation (CGMH), also known as Chang Gung is a medical and hospital network located in Taiwan. It was founded in 1973 by Wang Yung-ching to commemorate his father Wang Chang-gung. The hospital network has a total of 10,050 beds.

In 2012, the hospital network was featured in National Geographic Channel's documentary, "Taiwan's Medical Miracle".

History
Chang Gung Medical Foundation was founded by Formosa Plastics Group founder Wang Yung-ching along with his brother Wang Yung-tsai. The primary purpose is to provide healthcare to the Taiwanese public. In March 1973, the foundation completed its public registration and opened its first hospital, Taipei Chang Gung Memorial Hospital, in 1976. Its second and largest hospital, the Linkou Chang Gung Memorial Hospital, opened two years later in 1978. In 2005, the hospital network made a record RMB¥1.3 billion in profit.

In 2019, Chang Gung Medical Foundation signed a memorandum of understanding with hospitals in Malaysia expanding the foundation into the region. As of 2019 there are eight branches in the hospital network.

Controversies
In June 2017, Hospital chairwoman Diana Wang, returned to Taiwan to deal with the resignation of 22 emergency room doctors in the network after two emergency-room supervisors were dismissed rumored to be due to budget issues. In September of the same year, family members of patients in Linkou Chang Gung Hospital complained about some staff members not wearing isolation gowns when entering and leaving the intensive care unit ward.

Branches

Taipei Chang Gung Memorial Hospital
The oldest establishment of the Chang Gung Hospital network, Taipei Chang Gung Memorial Hospital was established in 1976. Situated in  Taipei it has 262 beds and 195 physicians. Taipei Chang Gung, along with Linkou Chang Gung and Taoyuan Branch, is the largest medical center in Taiwan, with the capacity of handling academic research, clinical services, and medical education and training.
 Beds: 262
 Physicians: 195

Linkou Chang Gung Memorial Hospital

The largest and second oldest of the Chang Gung hospitals, Linkou Chang Gung Memorial Hospital was established shortly after Taipei CGMH, in 1978 in Taoyuan. With larger areas of land within close vicinity of Taipei, Linkou Chang Gung was able to erect multiple buildings, including Medical Building, Pathology Building, Rehabilitation Building, Children's Building, and Education Building. It has 3470 beds and 1450 physicians. Linkou Chang Gung, along with Taipei Chang Gung and Taoyuan Branch, is the largest medical center in Taiwan, with the capacity of handling academic research, clinical services, and medical education and training.
 Beds: 3,470
 Physicians: 1,450

Keelung Chang Gung Memorial Hospital

A district hospital in Keelung, Taiwan, Keelung Chang Gung Memorial Hospital was inaugurated in 1985. It specializes in General Medicine, Oncology, Psychiatry, and Rehabilitation Departments. Also in Keelung, the Lover's Lake Branch falls under Keelung Chang Gung's jurisdiction.
 Beds: 1,098 (including Lover's Lake Branch)
 Physicians: 301 (including Lover's Lake Branch)

Kaohsiung Chang Gung Memorial Hospital
Located in Kaohsiung, Taiwan and established in 1986, Kaohsiung Chang Gung Memorial Hospital is categorized as a medical center, capable of handling academic research, clinical services, and medical education and training. The hospital has 3 main buildings: Medical Building, Children's Building, and Rehabilitation Building.
 Beds: 2,724
 Physicians: 861

Chiayi Chang Gung Memorial Hospital
Established in 2002, Chiayi Chang Gung Memorial Hospital is a district hospital in Chiayi County, Taiwan. In 2001, its founder believed the people of Chiayi lacked medical resources and expertise and built a hospital in a former sugar field.
 Beds: 1,379
 Physicians: 314

Chang Gung Memorial Hospital - Taoyuan Branch
The Chang Gung Memorial Hospital - Taoyuan Branch opened in 2003 in Taoyuan. Taoyuan Branch is a part of the largest medical center in Taiwan, with the capacity of handling academic research, clinical services, and medical education and training. The Taoyuan Branch has specialized centers such as the Beauty Center, the Healthcare Center, and the Chinese Medicine Hospital.
 Beds: 696
 Physicians: 129

Chang Gung Memorial Hospital - Lover's Lake Branch
Established in 2006, the Chang Gung Memorial Hospital - Lover's Lake Branch falls under Keelung Chang Gung's jurisdiction and services patients residing in north-eastern Taiwan.
 Beds: 1,098 (including Keelung Chang Gung)
 Physicians: 301 (including Keelung Chang Gung)

Yunlin Chang Gung Memorial Hospital

Established in 2009, Yunlin Chang Gung Memorial Hospital is a regional hospital in Yunlin County, Taiwan. The hospital focuses on remote medical care, providing medical services to remote and suburban residents, with specialties in burns, and poison and disaster control. Yunlin Chang Gung has 138 beds, 22 physicians, and 196 medical staff.
 Beds: 138
 Physicians: 22

References

External links
 

1973 establishments in Taiwan
Formosa Plastics Group
Hospital networks
Hospitals in Taiwan